Elisabeth Vincentelli is a French-born, New York-based arts and culture journalist. She is a regular contributor to The New York Times’ Arts section. She served as the chief drama critic for the New York Post from 2009 until 2016, having replaced Clive Barnes after his death in 2008.

Biography
She was born in France and came to the United States in the late 1980s. She writes a blog called The Determined Dilettante. Previous to writing for the Post she joined Time Out New York in 2000, and later became the 'Arts & Entertainment Editor' there. Vincentelli has written for The New Yorker, The New York Times, Newsday, and The Village Voice, and is a member of the New York Drama Critics' Circle.

Vincentelli is the author of Abba Gold (2004) about the pop group ABBA and Abba Treasures. She co-hosts the theater podcast Marks & Vincentelli on Substack with Peter Marks of the Washington Post. She co-hosted the podcast Three on the Aisle with fellow critics Terry Teachout and Peter Marks for American Theatre Magazine, which ran from 2017 to 2021.

, she resides in the Park Slope neighborhood of Brooklyn.

References

External links
 Three on the Aisle (podcast) at American Theatre

Year of birth missing (living people)
21st-century non-fiction writers
21st-century American women writers
American women podcasters
American podcasters
American theater critics
American women journalists
Critics employed by The New York Times
French emigrants to the United States
Living people
New York Post people
Newsday people
People from Park Slope
The New Yorker critics
The Village Voice people
American women critics
Writers from Brooklyn